The Women's balance beam event took place on 8 October 2010 at the Indira Gandhi Arena.

Final

References
Results

Gymnastics at the 2010 Commonwealth Games
2010 in women's gymnastics